The 2020 Summer Paralympics opening ceremony took place on 24 August 2021 at the Olympic Stadium in Tokyo, Japan. The theme of the opening ceremony was "Moving Forward: We Have Wings" and thus surrounded around the theme of aviation, airplanes, airports, and everything that involved air travel.

Weather conditions
 20:00 temperature  humidity 69% 
 23:00 temperature  humidity 80%
 At the observation point, it rained at each hour of 20:00, 22:00, and 23:00 to the extent that an hourly rainfall of 0 (mm) was recorded.

Venue

The Japan National Stadium, also referred to as the Olympic Stadium, served as the main stadium for the opening ceremony. The stadium will also serve as the main stadium for the closing ceremony, and the athletics/track and field events.

Parade of nations

In the announcement of the Refugee Paralympic Team, it was stated that the team would enter first in the parade of nations. The rest of the countries entered in the Japanese Gojūon alphabetical order, with the last three teams being the United States, France, and Japan as the current host of the Paralympics as the final team and the next two hosts being Los Angeles 2028 and Paris 2024, so the United States and France entered as the final two teams before the Japanese team. Unlike the Olympics, Greece does not enter at the start of the parade, but instead follows the regular alphabetical order. After the parade of nations, there is a welcome greeting to the Para Airport.

Performers
Japanese pianist Nobuyuki Tsujii was among the musicians who participated in the Opening Ceremony, although not in person. A recording of a composition by him ("House of Wind"), performed with an orchestra, was played while the flag of Japan was carried on stage. 13 year old Yui Wago performed the role of the 'Little One-Winged Plane'.

The announcers at all ceremonies were Mai Shoji (English) and Hiroyuki Sekino (Japanese).

Flame

Dignitaries in attendance

Host country dignitaries 
 – 
Emperor Naruhito
Prime Minister Yoshihide Suga
Tokyo governor Yuriko Koike
Minister of State for the Tokyo Olympic and Paralympic Games Tamayo Marukawa
Chief Cabinet Secretary of Japan Katsunobu Katō

Dignitaries from international organizations 
 – President Andrew Parsons
 – President Thomas Bach

Dignitaries from abroad 
 – Presidential Advisor for the Participation of Persons with Disabilities Jairo Clopatofsky
 – Korean Paralympic Committee president Lee Myung-ho 
 – Second Gentleman Doug Emhoff

Anthems
 National anthem of Japan – Hirari Sato 
 Paralympic Hymn

Ceremony key team 
Source:

See also
2020 Summer Olympics opening ceremony
2020 Summer Olympics closing ceremony
2020 Summer Paralympics closing ceremony

Notes

References

Opening ceremony
Ceremonies in Japan
Paralympics opening ceremonies